William Randall (18 September 1885 – 9 January 1965) was a British weightlifter. He competed in the men's lightweight event at the 1924 Summer Olympics.

References

External links
 

1885 births
1965 deaths
British male weightlifters
Olympic weightlifters of Great Britain
Weightlifters at the 1924 Summer Olympics
Sportspeople from Merthyr Tydfil